Milwaukie/Main Street is a MAX Orange Line station located in downtown Milwaukie, Oregon. It is the second northbound station on the Orange Line, preceded by the terminus at SE Park Ave. The station is located along Union Pacific Railroad right-of-way on a site bounded by Lake Road, SE 21st Avenue, and Adams Street near the city's post office. Amenities at the station including bike parking and connections to TriMet bus routes 29, 32, 33, and 34; it also has no parking spaces for cars.

Bus service
29 - Lake/Webster Rd
30 - Estacada (express only)
32 - Oatfield
33 - McLoughlin/King Rd
34 - Linwood/River Rd
75 - Lombard/Cesar Chavez
99 - Macadam/McLoughlin Express (rush hour express only)
152 - Milwaukie

See also
 Milwaukie Transit Center – former transit center

References

External links
Milwaukie/Main Street station (southbound) information from TriMet
 Milwaukie/Main Street station (northbound) information from TriMet
MAX Light Rail Stations – more general TriMet page

2015 establishments in Oregon
MAX Light Rail stations
MAX Orange Line
Milwaukie, Oregon
Railway stations in Clackamas County, Oregon
Railway stations in the United States opened in 2015